The 3rd Japan Record Award was held on December 28, 1961.

Emcee
Takayuki Akutagawa
2nd time as the emcee of JRA.

Award Winners

Japan Record Award
 Frank Nagai for "Kimi Koishi" 
 Lyricist: Otoha Shigure
 Composer: Kouka Sassa
 Arranger: Shinzou Teraoka
 Record Company: JVC Victor

Vocalist Award
George Ai for "Garasu No Johnny"

New Artist Encouragement Award
Miki Nakasone for "Kawa Wa Nagareru"
Miyuki Yamanaka for "Danchi No Ojōsan"
Kouji Hirano for "Shiroi Hana No Blues"
Akira Matsushima for "Koshū" 
Tatsumi Fujino for "Musume Sandogasa" 
Utako Yanagi for "Saihate No Uta"

Composer Encouragement Award
Shousuke Ichikawa for "Koishite Irundamon"
Singer: Chiyoko Shimakura

Arranger Award
Masakazu Hirose for "Keijimono Datari"
Singer: Sachiko Nishida/ 57 All Stars

Lyricist Award
Takao Saeki for "Shiroi Hana No Blues" and "Isobushi Genta"
Singer: Kouji Hirano, Yukio Hashi

Planning Award
Nippon Columbia for "Nihon Kayō Shi"

Children's Song Award
Toshie Kusunoki for "Kakashi No Negaigoto"

References

Japan Record Awards
Japan Record Awards
Japan Record Awards
1961